Operation Green or Case Green was the name of three separate cancelled German military operations immediately before and during the Second World War.

Fall Grün (Czechoslovakia), the planned invasion of Czechoslovakia, to be carried out in September 1938
Operation Green (Ireland), the planned invasion of Ireland in support of the invasion of Britain
Operation Tannenbaum, the planned invasion of Switzerland, known earlier as Operation Green

Operation Green may also refer to:

Operation Green (police investigation), a 2000 murder inquiry in the United Kingdom
Operation Greens, an Indian Government scheme to stabilize the supply of Tomato, Onion and Potato (TOP) crops.